The list of shipwrecks in June 1923 includes ships sunk, foundered, grounded, or otherwise lost during June 1923.

1 June

3 June

4 June

6 June

8 June

10 June

13 June

18 June

19 June

21 June

22 June

23 June

24 June

25 June

26 June

29 June

30 June

References

1923-06
Maritime incidents in June 1923
06
June 1923 events